Henry Clarence Baldridge (November 24, 1868 – June 8, 1947) was an American politician. A Republican, he was the 14th governor of Idaho, serving from 1927 until 1931.

Biography
Born in Carlock, Illinois, Baldridge was educated in public schools. He attended Illinois Wesleyan University and then taught school. He married Cora A. McCreighton on February 1, 1893. They had a son, M. Claire Baldridge, and a daughter, L. Gail Baldridge.

Career
Baldridge relocated from Illinois to Southwestern Idaho in 1904 and settled in Parma, working in the mercantile trade. Later he dealt in implements and hardware and was president of the local bank. Baldridge entered the Idaho Legislature in 1911 as a member of the Idaho House of Representatives. In 1913, he was elected to the Idaho Senate, where he served a single term. In 1922 he was elected the 15th lieutenant governor of Idaho. He was re-elected in 1924 and served in that capacity in the administration of Governor Charles C. Moore. Baldridge was elected governor in 1926 and re-elected in 1928. Although he warned against the expansion of public building programs, significant additions were made to the University of Idaho in Moscow, Idaho. State highway building was financed by a state gasoline tax.

After leaving office on January 5, 1931, Baldridge returned to his various business interests. He ran for Congress in Idaho's 1st congressional district in 1942, but was defeated in the general election by five-term incumbent Compton I. White of Clark Fork. Baldridge was appointed Commissioner of Charitable Returns and served from 1943 to 1945.

Death
After the death of his wife, Baldridge moved from Parma to Boise in 1942. He died in Boise on June 8, 1947, and is interred at Parma Cemetery in Parma.

References

External links
National Governors Association

1868 births
1947 deaths
People from McLean County, Illinois
Presbyterians from Illinois
Republican Party governors of Idaho
Lieutenant Governors of Idaho
Republican Party Idaho state senators
Republican Party members of the Idaho House of Representatives
People from Parma, Idaho
20th-century American politicians
Illinois Wesleyan University alumni